Vamuna maculata is a moth in the subfamily Arctiinae. It was described by Frederic Moore in 1878. It is found in India (Arunachal Pradesh, Darjeeling, Nagaland, North India to Malaya, Sikkim) and on Peninsular Malaysia, Sumatra and Borneo.

References

Moths described in 1878
Lithosiina